is a 1996 fighting game by Tecmo and the first entry in Team Ninja's long-running Dead or Alive series. It was released first in arcades, followed by home ports for the Sega Saturn in Japan, and later for the PlayStation in all regions.

Capitalizing on the success of Sega's Virtua Fighter fighting game series at the time, Dead or Alive takes influence from Virtua Fighter while adding unique gameplay elements of its own. The game was well-praised for its fighting system and advanced graphics. The game also attracted attention for its presentation, which was more provocative than other mainstream 3D fighting games at the time.

Dead or Alive was a commercial success, helping Tecmo overcome their financial problems. The success of the game helped turn the series into a franchise, including several sequels and numerous spinoffs. The game was followed by Dead or Alive 2 in 1999.

Gameplay 
The gameplay of Dead or Alive borrows from Virtua Fighter, but makes some key changes that changes the way Dead or Alive is played in comparison to Virtua Fighter.

Unlike other fighting games of the time, in place of a "Guard" button, Dead or Alive uses a "Hold" button, which causes the fighter to grab their opponent's limbs if they are attacking at the time. This Countering system was the first in the fighting genre to utilize different commands that correspond to each type of attack. There are two kinds of holds, an Offensive Hold and a Defensive Hold; the latter are executed by holding back or forward on the directional pad along with the guard input to either force away or counter-damage an opponent.

The outer edges of the fighting arena, called "Danger Zones", are set with explosives which deal a high amount of damage to any fighter who comes in contact with them. They can also send an affected character in the air so the opposing player can execute a juggling air combo. However, this can be avoided with a defensive roll.

Characters 

Bayman, a Russian mercenary and commando hired to kill DOATEC's founder and CEO, Fame Douglas.
Gen Fu, an old Chinese shini-rokugo-ken martial arts master and bookstore owner, who enters the tournament to win the prize money in order to provide funds for his sick granddaughter, Mei Linn. 
Jann Lee, a Chinese jeet kune do martial artist, who enters the tournament to test his skills against powerful opponents. His character is modeled on Bruce Lee.
Kasumi, a Japanese kunoichi of the Mugen Tenshin Ninja Clan, who abandons her village to search for Raidou, the man who crippled her brother, Hayate.
Leifang, a young Chinese taikyoku-ken prodigy, who enters the tournament to defeat Jann Lee.
Raidou (unlockable), an evil ninja exiled from Kasumi's clan.
Ryu Hayabusa, a Japanese ninja hero of the Hayabusa Ninja Clan and best friend of Kasumi's brother. He enters the tournament to fulfil his thirst for a challenge. He is originally from Ninja Gaiden.
Tina Armstrong, a flamboyant American professional wrestler, who enters the tournament to be noticed by Hollywood.
Zack, a flamboyant African-American DJ and kickboxer, who enters the tournament to win the prize money.

Added in the PlayStation and Arcade++ versions are Kasumi's half-sister Ayane and Tina's father Bass Armstrong.
Ayane, a Japanese kunoichi from the same clan as Kasumi. Ayane was ordered to kill Kasumi for abandoning their village.
Bass Armstrong, an American professional wrestling champion and father of Tina. He tries to stop Tina from being noticed by Hollywood.

Plot 
A massive corporation known as DOATEC (Dead or Alive Tournament Executive Committee) host a fighting competition called the Dead or Alive World Combat Championship, where fighters from all over the world can compete for the title as world champion and a vast amount of money. A runaway kunoichi known as Kasumi enters the Dead or Alive tournament to seek revenge against her uncle Raidou, who was responsible for crippling her brother, Hayate. 

Kasumi's brother, Hayate, was next in line to succeed their father, Shiden, as the 18th leader of the Mugen Tenshin Ninja Clan. After Hayate was crippled by Raidou, Shiden was left bitter from what Raidou did to his son, and Shiden refused to discuss the details surrounding the attack. Shiden ordered his daughter, Kasumi, to take her brother's place as the next leader of their clan. However, Kasumi abandoned the village. Learning that her evil uncle was her brother's attacker, Kasumi tracks him down to the Dead or Alive tournament where she enters to defeat him. 

Kasumi eventually defeats and kills Raidou, but her decision to leave her village without permission violates the strict laws of the ninja society and is punishable by death. As a result, she becomes a hunted fugitive.

Development and release 
During the mid 1990s, Japanese gaming company Tecmo was in financial trouble. Seeing how popular Sega's Virtua Fighter series was in Japan at the time, the management asked Tomonobu Itagaki to create a game similar to Virtua Fighter. Itagaki was a fan of Virtua Fighter, but he wanted Dead or Alive to stand out among the competition. This included a stronger emphasis on being provocative, as Itagaki believed entertainment needed both sexuality and violence to truly be entertainment. All the animations in the game were created using motion capture.

The original game, which runs on the Sega Model 2 arcade board, the same arcade board that Virtua Fighter 2 ran on, had polygonal modeled backgrounds. Dead or Alive was unveiled alongside Jaleco's Super GT 24h at the February 1996 AOU show as part of Sega's announcement that they were licensing their Model 2 hardware to third-party companies.

In comparison to other 3D fighters, such as Tekken (which gained a substantial market base in Japan and North America), DOA introduced a countering system unique to the genre and an added emphasis on speed, as well as a rich graphics engine that lacked many jaggies and incorporated very smooth surfaces.

A Nintendo 64 port was rumored, but did not come to fruition. Dead or Alive was instead ported to the Sega Saturn exclusively for the Japanese market in 1997. Acclaim intended to bring the Saturn version to the UK by Christmas 1997, but plans were shelved for unknown reasons. When ported to the Saturn, the developers used Gouraud shading (a feature not available on Model 2) for the character models to compensate for the Saturn not being able to generate as many polygons as the Model 2 hardware. The Saturn conversion uses bitmaps and parallax scrolling in the same fashion as the Saturn version of Virtua Fighter 2. It also includes a new rendered intro and tournament and training modes.

In 1998, Tecmo released Dead or Alive for the PlayStation in all regions. It was the first game designed for Sega arcade hardware to be ported to the PlayStation. This version included two new characters, a different graphics engine, a slightly revamped fighting engine, new alternate costumes, and new background music. Most of the PlayStation version's development team had worked on the original arcade version. Tecmo also released an upgrade titled Dead or Alive++ for the arcades in Japan which was based on the PlayStation version. This version was based on the PlayStation version with a slightly updated gameplay that was later expanded for the sequel, Dead or Alive 2.

Reception 

In Japan, Game Machine listed Dead or Alive on their January 1, 1997 issue as being the most-popular arcade game for the previous two weeks. Game Machine also listed Dead or Alive++ on their November 15, 1998 issue as being the eleventh most-popular arcade game for the previous two weeks.

Although it was not widely distributed in U.S. arcades, Dead or Alive was a commercial success, helping Tecmo pull in a profit of 9.2 million dollars in 1996 and saving the company from bankruptcy. The Saturn version would go on to sell more than 161,000 copies in Japan.

Upon the game's release in arcades, a Next Generation reviewer commented, "A fighting game that mimics Virtua Fighter 2 in its look and feel to a frightening degree ... Dead or Alive boasts smooth control, crisp polygonal graphics, and an attitude that may enable this game to stand on its own despite its familiar origins." He identified the variety of characters and the danger zones as the game's standout features, and said the tough AI forces players to learn more complex moves and strategies.

The home versions were successful critically as well. Due to the Saturn version's planned (and eventually aborted) releases in the U.S. and UK, it saw a considerable number of reviews in those two countries. Sega Saturn Magazine described Dead or Alive as "An incredible beat 'em up both technically and visually, even getting close to beating Sega's own-brand VF [Virtua Fighter] games." Computer and Video Games called it "an essential buy for import Saturn gamers", while Next Generation commented, "Dead or Alive is such a polished game that it's surprising to realize this is Tecmo's first 3D fighter." GamePro lauded it for its vast number of moves and throws, and its fast and intense fights.

Praise for the game typically focused on its "hold" mechanic. Next Generation said this mechanic adds a unique tone to the game and blurs the line between offense and defense during fights, replacing the usual fighting game scenario of one character attacking and the other defending with more of a "push-and-pull" struggle for dominance. Electronic Gaming Monthly editor-in-chief John Davison commented that the requisite "use of a character's weight and inertia blazes a trail for other games to follow." One of his co-reviewers, Dan Hsu, said the system of holds and reversals is the best part of the game. GameSpot noted that using holds, "you can counter holds and attacks and then reverse counters on top of that, so you sometimes can get an awesome Jackie Chan-style grappling match that goes back and forth three or four times till someone messes up and pays the consequences."

The "bouncing breast" feature was widely ridiculed for its exaggerated and prolonged animation, which critics regarded as comical and grotesque rather than appealing. Sega Saturn Magazine noted that the breasts "wobble up and down like jellies and seem to operate totally independently to the rest of the girl's body", and Jeff Gerstmann similarly remarked in GameSpot that "They bounce around like gelatin for no apparent reason." He considered it a relief that the feature can be turned off, describing it as "stupid" and "the very definition of overkill." IGN was not as annoyed, but pointed out that the bouncing breasts "don't actually contribute to the gameplay except to add temporary novelty and libido frustration to the typical gamer." Computer and Video Games saw the feature as having a campy appeal, finding humor in how "The slightest movement is enough to set them off, swinging and bouncing around in a most comical fashion!" The reviewer compared it unfavorably to the more realistic breast physics in Fighting Vipers.

A number of reviewers praised the quality of the arcade-to-Saturn conversion, and most applauded this version's high-resolution graphics and detail. However, reviews for the later PlayStation version hailed it as even better, with enhanced graphics and enjoyable new content which adds to the replay value. IGN went so far as to say that "The Model 2 graphics have ported over to the PlayStation better than they've ever been on the Saturn". (Many of the Saturn's killer apps were Model 2 ports, including Virtua Fighter 2.)

GamesRadar included Dead or Alive at number 28 in their list of best Sega Saturn games, stating that "the game's high-speed, rock-paper-scissors style of play was a quick hit with arcade players". In 2011, Complex ranked it as the seventh best fighting game of all time.

Remake 

In 2004, Tecmo released Dead or Alive Ultimate, a package that featured revamps of the first two DOA games, on the Xbox. The remake of the first game was based on the Sega Saturn version, as it was Itagaki's preferred version. It featured smoother graphics, sound updated from stereo to surround, and adds Xbox Live online gaming. Both Dead or Alive 1 Ultimate and Dead or Alive 2 Ultimate were among the first fighting games with online play.

Notes

References

External links 
Saturn version official website 
PlayStation version official website 
Dead or Alive at MobyGames

1996 video games
3D fighting games
Arcade video games
Multiplayer and single-player video games
Video games about ninja
Video games about revenge
Martial arts video games
Cancelled Nintendo 64 games
Dead or Alive (franchise) video games
PlayStation (console) games
PlayStation Network games
Sega Saturn games
Fighting games
Video games developed in Japan
Video games featuring female protagonists
Xbox games
Koei Tecmo games